Schenectady County is a county in the U.S. state of New York. As of the 2020 census, the population was 158,061. The county seat is Schenectady. The name is from a Mohawk language word meaning "on the other side of the pine lands," a term that originally applied to Albany.

Schenectady County is part of the Albany-Schenectady-Troy, NY Metropolitan Statistical Area, and is west of the confluence of the Mohawk with the Hudson River. It includes territory on the north and the south sides of the Mohawk River.

History
This area of the river valley was historically occupied by the Mohawk people, the easternmost of the Five Nations comprising the Iroquois Confederacy or Haudenosaunee. They cultivated maize fields in the flats along the Mohawk River and had villages in the hills.

European settlement started in the present-day county by Dutch colonists in the 17th century; the village of Schenectady was founded in 1661. The fur traders in Albany kept a monopoly and prohibited settlers in Schenectady from the trade; those residents mostly became farmers. Other areas of the county were also developed for farming. The English enforced the Albany monopoly on the fur trade when they took over the New Netherland colony in 1664.

The English organized counties in the Province of New York in 1683; the area of the present-day Schenectady County was included in Albany County. Albany County contained an enormous area, including the northern part of New York State as well as all of the present State of Vermont and, in theory, extending westward to the Pacific Ocean. This county was reduced in size on July 3, 1766, by the creation of Cumberland County, and further on March 16, 1770, by the creation of Gloucester County, both containing territory now within the state of Vermont.

On March 12, 1772, Albany County was divided to form two other counties. The area of Schenectady County was still within the reduced Albany.

From 1772 to 1786 Albany County included, besides the present territory of Albany County, all of the present Columbia, Rensselaer, Saratoga, and Schenectady counties, parts of the present Greene and Washington counties, and a piece of what is now southwestern Vermont.

In 1786 Albany County was reduced in size when Columbia County was organized; and again in 1791 by the splitting off of Rensselaer and Saratoga counties and the transfer of the Town of Cambridge to Washington County. It was further reduced in size in 1795 by the splitting off of a part that was combined with a portion of Otsego County to create Schoharie County. It was further reduced in size in 1800 by the splitting off of a part that was combined with a portion of Ulster County to create Greene County.

In 1809, Schenectady County was split from Albany County and has kept its current borders. The city of Schenectady was designated as the county seat and is the only city in the county. Major European immigration began in the mid-19th century, with the arrival of Irish refugees from the Great Famine. More immigrants were attracted to the city for its industrial jobs, including those from Italy and Poland. In the late 19th and early 20th centuries, the city became an industrial powerhouse and center of innovation, the headquarters of General Electric and other national corporations.

The city of Schenectady reached its peak of population in 1930 but the county reached its peak in 1970, according to US Census data (see table below for county data.) These differences reflect different settlement patterns and the development of suburban housing outside the city limits. The city of Schenectady lost many jobs and population in the late 20th century due to industrial and railroad restructuring; some people stayed in the county working at alternative positions, including commuting to the capital of Albany.

Geography

Schenectady County is located in east central New York State, northwest of Albany, an area usually considered "Upstate".

Adjacent counties
 Saratoga County - northeast
 Albany County - southeast
 Schoharie County - southwest
 Montgomery County - west

Demographics

As of the census of 2010, there were 154,727 people, 60,684 households, and 39,918 families residing in the county.  The population density was 275/km2 (711/sq mi).  There were 68,032 housing units at an average density of 122/km2 (316/sq mi).  The racial makeup of the county was 79.77% White, 9.79% Black or African American, 0.23% Native American, 3.97% Asian, 0.03% Pacific Islander, 1.21% from other races, and 2.00% from two or more races. 6.17% of the population were Hispanic or Latino of any race. 24.3% were of Italian, 14.7% Irish, 8.7% German, 6.4% Polish, 4.0 Puerto Rican, 3.9% English ancestry according to Census 2010. 87.6% spoke English, 4.7% Spanish and 1.1% Italian as their first language.

There were 60,684 households, out of which 30.00% had children under the age of 18 living with them, 45.50% were married couples living together, 14.30% had a female householder with no husband present, and 36.30% were non-families. 30.60% of all households were made up of individuals, and 12.60% had someone living alone who was 65 years of age or older.  The average household size was 2.58 and the average family size was 3.17.

In the county, the population was spread out, with 24.30% under the age of 18, 7.90% from 18 to 24, 28.10% from 25 to 44, 23.00% from 45 to 64, and 16.60% who were 65 years of age or older.  The median age was 39 years. For every 100 females there were 92.60 males.  For every 100 females age 18 and over, there were 88.30 males.

The median income for a household in the county was $53,399 ($41,739-2000), and the median income for a family was $57,670. Males had a median income of $41,840 versus $29,339 for females. The per capita income for the county was $24,992.  About 7.80% of families and 11.90% of the population were below the poverty line, including 17.70% of those under age 18 and 5.50% of those age 65 or over.

2020 Census

Government and politics

|}

Voters in Schenectady County have typically leaned Democratic since the mid-20th century. They have given small to moderate leads to Democrats since 1988 in presidential elections. The congressman Paul Tonko is a Democrat.
Legislative authority is vested in the County Legislature, which consists of 15 members representing 8 communities, separated into four districts. The current composition of the Legislature is as follows (10 Democrats, 2 Republicans, and 3 Conservatives who caucus with the Democrats):

District 1 - Schenectady:
  Richard Patierne (D)
  Richard Ruzzo (D)
  Margaret King (D)

District 2 - Schenectady:
  Philip Fields (D), Deputy Chair
  Gary Hughes (D), Majority Leader
  Jeffrey M. McDonald (D),  Vice Chair

District 3 - Glenville, Niskayuna, and Scotia:
  Thomas Constantine (D)
  Cathy Gatta (D)
  Grant Socha (C)
  Sara Mae Pratt (D)
  Michelle Ostrelich (D)

District 4 - Duanesburg, Princetown, and Rotterdam:
  Anthony Jasenski (D), Chair
  Brian McGarry (R),  Minority Leader
  Randy Pascarella (C)
  Holly Vellano (C)

County government
Schenectady County was governed by an elected Board of Supervisors until 1966, after voters approved a new county charter under New York's home rule law.

On January 2, 1966, a Board of Representatives replaced the county supervisors.  In 1987, a 15-member legislature replaced the Board of Representatives.  The legislature hires a county manager to oversee day-to-day government operations.

County services
The county operates the Schenectady County Public Library (SCPL), which consists of a central library and eight branches.
http://www.scpl.org

Communities

Larger Settlements

† - County Seat

Towns
 Duanesburg
 Glenville
 Niskayuna
 Princetown
 Rotterdam

Hamlets
 Alplaus
 Aqueduct
 Quaker Street

See also

 List of counties in New York
 National Register of Historic Places listings in Schenectady County, New York

References

Further reading
 
 
 , selected chapters available online in transcribed version, including one on genealogy

External links

 Official Schenectady County government site
 
Schenectady County Historical Society
Schenectady County Public Library

 
1809 establishments in New York (state)
Populated places established in 1809
New York placenames of Native American origin